Staffanstorp is a locality and the seat of Staffanstorp Municipality, Skåne County, Sweden with 14,808 inhabitants in 2010. Staffanstorp is the largest Scanian settlement never to acquire town privileges before 1971, when they were abolished in Sweden.

Geography 

The town is situated at the center of a large triangular fertile plain, reaching approximately 25 kilometres from the Øresund strait inwards in Scania. The base of the triangle follows the coast, approximately 25 kilometres starting in Malmö in the south.

History
As a village it is mentioned in 14th century sources, but it would remain fairly insignificant in the shadow of more important towns such as Lund, Dalby and Malmö. An inn and the local hundred-jail with two cells were located there in the 19th century. 

Staffanstorp has been the site for Housing Trade Shows, the first in 1970 with 43 furnished homes and 100.000 paying visitors, and the most recent in 1997, with 25 exhibited homes. In the 1990s the town center was recreated with inspiration from New Urbanism. The unpopular buildings from the 1960s were literally covered by new roofs, façades and more stories built in a traditional Scanian pastiche architectural style  , a couple of multi-storey buildings were added on a lot that had previously been the local stadium, and the road plan was further complicated in order to make drivers slow down and if possible avoid going through the center at all.

Schools 
Staffanstorp has two högstadieskola schools (senior level of compulsory school), Baldersskolan and Hagalidskolan. Baldersskolan  is located in the central part of Staffanstorp. It had approximately 500 pupils in 2005, but now the amount is about 250 due to fewer born children.

In 2013, Baldersskolan changed its name from Centralskolan and began housing students between the ages 6 to 15.

Hagalidskolan also has an MFF academy.

Internationella Engelska Skolan Staffanstorp opened its doors in August 2022. It is an independent school from F-Klass- Year 9. In 2022 there were 450 students enrolled

Notable people 
Renate Cerljen Miss Universe Sweden 2009
Dick Harrison historian 
Anders Johnsson (sport shooter)
Malin Strömberg swimmer in 1992 Summer Olympics
Anders Jansson
Jonas Ridderstråle business speaker and author

References 

 Lärn-Nilsson & Larsson (2002), Staffanstorps Kommun 50 år,  (Swedish)

Populated places in Skåne County
Municipal seats of Skåne County
Swedish municipal seats
Populated places in Staffanstorp Municipality
19th-century establishments in Skåne County